Bismillah Jan Shinwari (born 17 March 1984) is an Afghan cricket umpire. He has stood in matches in the 2017 Ghazi Amanullah Khan Regional One Day Tournament and the 2017–18 Ahmad Shah Abdali 4-day Tournament in Afghanistan.

He stood in his first Twenty20 International (T20I) match between Afghanistan and Zimbabwe on 5 February 2018. He stood in his first One Day International (ODI) match between Afghanistan and Zimbabwe on 11 February 2018.

Bomb blast
On 3 October 2020, a car bomb attack in Nangarhar Province, Afghanistan, killed 15 people and wounded 30 others. It was initially reported that Shinwari was there at the time of the explosion but had survived. However, later reports stated that he had been killed in the blast, along with his cousin, two of her children, and his nephew. On 4 October 2020, Shinwari spoke to the Bangladeshi website BD Crictime on a telephone call to confirm that he had not been killed in the blast.

See also
 List of One Day International cricket umpires
 List of Twenty20 International cricket umpires

References

External links
 

1984 births
Living people
Afghan One Day International cricket umpires
Afghan Twenty20 International cricket umpires
Place of birth missing (living people)